Guia Jelo (born Guglielmina Francesca Maria Jelo di Lentini; 5 May 1952) is an Italian actress. She appeared in more than forty films since 1978.

Selected filmography
 Corleone (1978)
 The Bride Was Beautiful (1986)
 Boys on the Outside (1990)
 The Escort (1993)
 The Whores (1994)
 Strangled Lives (1996)
 E adesso sesso (2001) as Anna
 Raul: Straight to Kill (2005) as Caterina
 My Name Is Thomas (2018) as Zia Rosario

References

External links 

1956 births
Living people
Italian film actresses